Sam Wilde (born 8 September 1995) is an English professional rugby league footballer who plays as a  or  for the Widnes Vikings in the Betfred Championship. 

He previously played for the Warrington Wolves, and had loan periods with the Widnes Vikings, Rochdale Hornets and the London Broncos.

Career

Warrington Wolves
Wilde, a former Shevington Sharks junior, he made his début for the Warrington Wolves against the Wigan Warriors at Halliwell Jones Stadium, Warrington on 2 July 2015.

He played in the 2016 Super League Grand Final defeat by the Wigan Warriors at Old Trafford.

Widnes Vikings
The Widnes club announced on 31 Oct 2019 that Wilde had joined the club for the 2020 season.

Ottawa Aces
On 12 Aug 2020 it was announced that Wilde had signed for the new franchise.

Newcastle Thunder
On 29 Nov 2020 it was announced that Wilde had signed for Newcastle Thunder for the 2021 season, after the deferment of Ottawa Aces joining the competition.

Widnes Vikings (re-join)
On 10 Aug 2021 it was reported that he had signed for Widnes Vikings in the RFL Championship.

References

External links
(archived by web.archive.org) Profile at warringtonwolves.com
Statistics at rugby-league.com
Broncos add Warrington’s Wilde

1995 births
Living people
English rugby league players
London Broncos players
Newcastle Thunder players
Place of birth missing (living people)
Rochdale Hornets players
Rugby league centres
Rugby league locks
Rugby league second-rows
Warrington Wolves players
Widnes Vikings players